Taken 2 is a 2012 English-language French action-thriller film directed by Olivier Megaton and starring Liam Neeson, Maggie Grace, Famke Janssen, Rade Šerbedžija, Leland Orser, Jon Gries, D.B. Sweeney and Luke Grimes. It follows Bryan Mills taking his family to Istanbul, only to be kidnapped, along with his ex-wife, by the father of one of the men he killed while saving his daughter two years prior.

It is the sequel to the 2008 film Taken and the second installment in the Taken trilogy. Released on 3 October 2012 in France by EuropaCorp and 5 October 2012 in the United States by 20th Century Fox, the film grossed over $376 million at the box office, but received negative reviews from critics. A third film, Taken 3, was released on 9 January 2015.

Plot
At the funeral of his son Marko and associates in Tropojë, Albanian mafia head and freelance terrorist Murad Hoxha vows to seek vengeance on his son's killer. Travelling to Paris with his men, he interrogates and tortures ex-French DGSE agent turned corrupt National Police officer Jean-Claude Pitrel, whose business card was found at the scene of Marko's death, but finds no information. He then bribes a corrupt police official for Pitrel's files and deduces that Pitrel's old friend, Bryan Mills, was responsible and is vacationing in Istanbul.

Meanwhile, Bryan has just finished his three-day security job for a wealthy Saudi Arabian sheikh in Istanbul and is surprised by his ex-wife, Lenore, and daughter, Kim, turning up to visit him. While going out for lunch with Lenore the next day, Bryan spots Murad's men following them. He tells Lenore to run and tries to outrun the Albanians, but finally surrenders when they capture Lenore. Realising that Kim is also a target, Bryan calls her at the hotel and tells her to hide in closet to escape the kidnappers . She narrowly avoids capture when the kidnappers are forced to flee after they shoot two security guards.

Regaining consciousness, Bryan finds himself zip tied to a pipe over his head in an empty basement. He uses a concealed miniature cellphone hidden in his sock to contact Kim and instructs her to alert the American embassy; instead, she convinces him to let her help. Opening her father's equipment case, Kim takes a grenade and detonates it on a nearby rooftop; the resulting sound allows Bryan to instruct her on triangulating his location.

The mobsters bring in Lenore, make a small incision in her neck, and hang her upside down to bleed out. As soon as they leave, Bryan frees himself and then Leonore. He next has Kim detonate two more grenades and releases some steam through a chimney to guide her to his location. Kim tosses a gun down the chimney, which Bryan uses to kill the guards holding him captive. He rescues Kim, but watches Lenore get recaptured. Stealing a taxi, Bryan and Kim pursue the kidnappers' van, and an SUV driven by one of the kidnappers' henchmen arrives to distract them. A chase and shootout ensue, alerting Turkish police, and ends when Bryan manages to lure the SUV into the path of an oncoming train, taking it out.

Leaving Kim at the American embassy, Bryan uses his memory to find Murad's hideout. He rescues Lenore and pursues the surviving mobsters to a bathhouse, where he kills them. Confronting Murad, Bryan offers to let him walk if he agrees to return home and cease his desire for revenge. Murad agrees, and Bryan drops his gun, but Murad tries to kill Bryan, only to find the gun unloaded. Realizing that Murad will never drop his vendetta against him, Bryan kills him by impaling him with a sharp towel hook.

Three weeks later, the Mills family, at a diner back in Los Angeles, has milkshakes to celebrate Kim passing her driving test. They are joined, much to Bryan's surprise, by Kim's boyfriend, Jamie, and she jokingly tells her father not to "shoot this one."

Alternative version
In an alternative version, Bryan rescues Lenore after she is recaptured. The taxi chase then takes place with Bryan, Kim and Lenore eventually making it to the American embassy. He then leaves them both at the Embassy to "finish it." Olivier Megaton decided against that version since questions arose over Bryan's motivation for pursuing Murad. It is included as an extra on the DVD and Blu-ray releases.

Cast

 Liam Neeson as Bryan Mills
 Maggie Grace as Kim Mills
 Famke Janssen as Lenore 'Lennie' Mills-St. John
 Rade Šerbedžija as Murad Hoxha
 Leland Orser as Sam Gilroy
 Jon Gries as Mark Casey
 D. B. Sweeney as Bernie Harris
 Luke Grimes as Jamie Conrad
 Olivier Rabourdin as Jean-Claude Pitrel
 Kevork Malikyan as Inspector Durmaz
 Luenell as Kim's Driving Instructor

Production
Filming took place throughout early 2012; Neeson and Grace shot their scenes in January in Los Angeles. The Istanbul scenes were shot in November 2011. Some scenes were filmed during a week at the new film studios of the Cité du Cinéma founded by Luc Besson in Saint-Denis in France.

Music
Nathaniel Méchaly composed the score for Taken 2, which was released on 1 October 2012.

Track listing
All songs written and composed by Nathaniel Méchaly except where noted.

Release
 was screened on 7 September 2012 at the 38th Deauville American Film Festival. It was theatrically released in more than 25 international markets, including North America, on 5 October 2012. The film was released under the title of "Busca Implacável 2" in Brazil, "Venganza: Conexión Estambul" in Spain, "Taken - La vendetta" in Italy and "Заложница 2" in Russia.

Box office
Taken 2 grossed $139.9 million in North America and $236.3 million in other territories, which brings the film's worldwide total to $376.1 million against a budget of $45 million.

For its opening day in North America, the film topped the box office and earned $18.4 million, $1.5 million of which came from midnight showings. In its opening weekend,  grossed $49.5 million in North America, playing in 3,661 theaters, with a $13,525 per-theatre average and debuting in the No. 1 spot, setting a new record for the highest-ever October opening in North America of a film rated PG-13, and earned about $55 million in other markets. During its second weekend at the North American box office, the film dropped 55.8% from its first weekend and grossed $21.9 million while holding onto the No. 1 spot. The film grossed a total of $3,385,094 in the Philippines by its fifth week. The biggest foreign markets being UK, France, Australia and South Korea where the film grossed $37.8 million, $24.4 million, $20.2 million and $15.5 million.

Critical response
On Rotten Tomatoes, the film holds an approval rating of 22% based on 169 reviews and an average rating of 4.21/10. The site's consensus reads: "Taken 2 is largely bereft of the kinetic thrills—and surprises—that made the original a hit." On Metacritic, the film has a score of 45 out of 100, based on 35 critics, indicating "mixed or average reviews".

Roger Ebert, of the Chicago Sun-Times, gave the film 3 stars out of 4, writing, " is slick, professional action" and concluding, "The cast is uniformly capable and dead serious, and if you're buying what [co-writer and producer] Luc Besson is selling, he's not short-changing you." Kenneth Turan of the Los Angeles Times wrote, "At a beefy 6-foot-4, Liam Neeson certainly looks physically imposing, but it was the notion of casting someone who can actually act in an action hero role that was the counter-intuitive concept that made both films— is more a remake than a sequel—so successful." Bernard Besserglik of The Hollywood Reporter reviewed the film after its screening at Deauville, concluding, "There's a touch of vigilante advocacy in the movie that will displease some, with Liam Neeson as a more gentlemanly version of the Charles Bronson of the Death Wish series, but clearly there's still a market for such fantasies. Moviegoers who liked Taken and want more of the same will get precisely that."

As they might say in the advertising department, it's an adrenaline-fuelled thrill ride. But it could have been much more." The same thing that happened four years ago in Taken, but different. (But the same.)" and that  "is simultaneously silly, nasty, a lazy festival of stereotypes, and a cleverly made piece of merchandise—i.e., it's the devil we know." Neil Genzlinger of The New York Times wrote that much of  "seems like a nonstop car and foot chase, with Albanian after Albanian falling victim to Bryan's remarkable aim and hand-fighting skills. Foreigners bad, Americans good, box office busy."

Keith Phipps of The A.V. Club gave the film a C grade, writing, "What begins as a family outing, with a hint of rekindled romance between the parents, devolves into kidnapping (the word 'taken' gets thrown about liberally), torture, high-speed chases, and other misadventures probably not smiled upon by the Turkish Board of Tourism. None of it is particularly novel or exciting." Alas, the movie can't help but descend into a pat part two, bereft of much suspense or tension." Peter Bradshaw of The Guardian gave the film 2 stars out of 5, concluding, "In the first movie, from the tailend of the Bush era, Liam was not shy about using Jack Bauerish torture techniques, wiring up evil-doers to the mains and zapping them with righteous volts. None of that now. That was a 15; this is a 12A, a bit tamer, just as ridiculous, but the premise is looking pretty tired."

Joe Neumaier of the Daily News also gave the film 2 stars out of 5, writing, " has a plot that could have been written by a GPS program, and contains all the technical charm that conjures up. Yet somehow, Liam Neeson growls through this just-acceptable action sequel with his dignity intact, his wallet bigger and his movie family oblivious to all that occurred in 2009's Taken." Neil Smith of Total Film gave the film 2 stars out of 5, concluding, "Yet while it's fun to watch him take out the Eurotrash, we've seen him do it better." Ann Hornaday of The Washington Post gave the film 1 star out of 4, writing, "You can't blame Liam Neeson, or the Taken producers, for trying to catch lightning in a bottle again.

Audiences polled by the market research firm CinemaScore gave the film a B+ grade on average, lower than the "A−" earned by its predecessor.

Accolades

Home media
Taken 2 was released on DVD and Blu-ray on 16 January 2013. The Blu-ray version was released with both the theatrical and unrated extended editions. , the film has sold 2,823,133 DVDs and 1,053,690 Blu-ray discs, grossing $44,136,725 and $19,915,776 respectively and totaling $64,052,501 in North America.

Sequel

A third film to the franchise, titled Taken 3, was released on 9 January 2015.

References

External links
 
 
 
 
 
 Taken 2 at The Numbers
 

Taken (franchise)
2012 films
2012 action thriller films
2010s chase films
2010s American films
20th Century Fox films
American action thriller films
American sequel films
English-language French films
EuropaCorp films
Albanian Mafia
Films about kidnapping
Films about families
Films directed by Olivier Megaton
Films produced by Luc Besson
Films scored by Nathaniel Méchaly
Films set in Albania
Films set in Turkey
Films set in Istanbul
Films set in Los Angeles
Films set in Paris
Films shot in Istanbul
Films shot in Los Angeles
Films shot in Paris
Films shot in Turkey
Films with screenplays by Luc Besson
Films with screenplays by Robert Mark Kamen
French action thriller films
French films about revenge
French sequel films
French vigilante films
British action thriller films
British sequel films
2010s English-language films
2010s British films
2010s French films